The Hommelvik train disaster was a train collision at Hommelvik Station, on the Meråker Line (today part of the Nordland Line) in Norway.

On 19 November 1940, a train with workers from Trondheim Central Station to Trondheim Airport, Værnes collided with the local train from Kopperå just east of Hommelvik Station. The Hommelvik train disaster killed 22 people. The trains were supposed to have passed at Hommelvik Station, but the engineer thought he had seen the other train, and had left the station. The accident occurred at 08:03, and was caused by there being virtually no light to see with, since all outdoor sources of light were covered.

References

Train collisions in Norway
Railway accidents in 1940
1940 in Norway
Meråker Line
Nordland Line
Malvik
Rail transport in Trøndelag
Accidents and incidents involving Norwegian State Railways (1883–1996)